Lois Miriam Wilson  (born Lois Freeman; April 8, 1927) is a retired United Church Minister who was the first female Moderator of the United Church of Canada, from 1980 to 1982. She was ordained a United Church minister in 1965, her husband having previously been ordained a United Church minister. From 1983 to 1989 she served as co-director of the Ecumenical Forum of Canada and also served as a president of the Canadian Council of Churches (1976-1979) as well as the World Council of Churches (1983-1991). A close friend of the noted Canadian novelist Margaret Laurence, she participated in several public forums with Laurence and presided at Laurence's 1986 funeral.

Wilson is a graduate of the University of Winnipeg, completing a Bachelor of Arts degree (1947; United College) and a Masters of Divinity (1950). She served in team ministry with her husband in United Church pastoral charges in Winnipeg, (’54-’60), Thunder Bay, (’60-69), Hamilton (’69-’78) and Kingston (’78-’80). Wilson was a board member of First Place, Hamilton from 1969-1977.

Wilson was active in the Student Christian Movement of Canada, as Student President in Manitoba (1944–46) and on the national level, and continues to be active in the World Student Christian Federation today. From 1967-1968, Wilson was the director of Town Talk, Thunder Bay, an innovative ecumenically sponsored program, utilizing all media, inviting citizens to publicly discuss issues affecting the future of their city. In 1984, she was a commentator for CBC on the Pope's visit to Canada.

A Companion of the Order of Canada, she was the 1985 recipient of the Pearson Medal of Peace. She is also a member of the Order of Ontario and a director of the Canadian Civil Liberties Association, who honoured her in 2014 for her public engagement.

In 1998 she was appointed to the Senate of Canada upon the recommendation of Jean Chrétien. She served in the chamber as an Independent until her retirement in 2002. She has held several other Canadian government appointments, including as a panel member of Environmental Assessment of the Disposal of Nuclear Waste (1989-1997).

From 1990 to 2000, she was the Chancellor of Lakehead University.

She currently serves as Distinguished Minister in Residence at Emmanuel College, Toronto at University of Toronto.

She has four children, twelve grandchildren and eight great-grandchildren.

She is the author of 9 books including, Turning the World Upside Down: A Memoir (Toronto: Doubleday Canada, 1989) and I Want to Be in That Number - Cool Saints I Have Known (Toronto: self-published, 2014). She also wrote the first chapter of Transforming the Faiths of our Fathers: Women who Changed American Religion (2004), edited by Ann Braude.

References

External links
 
 Pearson Medal of Peace - Lois M. Wilson
 Lois Miriam Wilson at The Canadian Encyclopedia

1927 births
Living people
Canadian clergy
Canadian senators from Ontario
Canadian university and college chancellors
Women members of the Senate of Canada
Companions of the Order of Canada
Independent Canadian senators
Members of the Order of Ontario
Members of the United Church of Canada
Ministers of the United Church of Canada
Moderators of the United Church of Canada
Politicians from Toronto
Politicians from Winnipeg
Women in Ontario politics
21st-century Canadian politicians
21st-century Canadian women politicians